The Yellow Kid (Mickey Dugan) is an American comic strip character that appeared from 1895 to 1898 in Joseph Pulitzer's New York World, and later William Randolph Hearst's New York Journal. Created and drawn by Richard F. Outcault in the comic strip Hogan's Alley (and later under other names as well), it was one of the first Sunday supplement comic strips in an American newspaper, although its graphical layout had already been thoroughly established in political and other, purely-for-entertainment cartoons. Outcault's use of word balloons in the Yellow Kid influenced the basic appearance and use of balloons in subsequent newspaper comic strips and comic books.

The cartoon was created to help educate the wealthy readers of the newspapers in which the comic strip appeared, showing them something of what life was like for people living in poverty. Outcault's aim was to make these wealthy readers more sympathetic to the plight of the poor, rather than judging them, and assuming they deserved to be in poverty.

The Yellow Kid is also famous for its connection to the coining of the term "yellow journalism". The idea of "yellow journalism" referred to stories which were sensationalized for the sake of selling papers, and was so named after the "Yellow Kid" cartoons. Although a cartoon, Outcault's work aimed its humor and social commentary at Pulitzer's adult readership. The strip has been described as "a turn-of-the-century theater of the city, in which class and racial tensions of the new urban, consumerist environment were acted out by a mischievous group of New York City kids from the wrong side of the tracks".

Character 
{{Quote box |quoted=true |bgcolor=#FFFFF0 |quote=The Yellow Kid was not an individual but a type. When I used to go about the slums on newspaper assignments I would encounter him often, wandering out of doorways or sitting down on dirty doorsteps. I always loved the Kid. He had a sweet character and a sunny disposition, and was generous to a fault. Malice, envy or selfishness were not traits of his, and he never lost his temper.<ref>The Yellow Kid on paper and stage, Origins of the Kid, retrieved 23 March 2011</ref>
—Richard F. Outcault, from a 1902 interview|align=right|width=50%
|}}
The Yellow Kid was a bald, snaggle-toothed barefoot boy who wore an oversized yellow nightshirt and hung around in a slum alley typical of certain areas of squalor that existed in late 19th-century New York City. Hogan's Alley was filled with equally odd characters, mostly other children. With a goofy grin, the Kid habitually spoke in a ragged, peculiar slang, which was printed on his shirt, a device meant to lampoon advertising billboards.

The Yellow Kid's head was drawn wholly shaved as if having been recently ridden of lice, a common sight among children in New York's tenement ghettos at the time. His nightshirt, a hand-me-down from an older sister, was white or pale blue in the first color strips.

 Publication history 

The character who would later become the Yellow Kid first appeared on the scene in a minor supporting role in a cartoon panel published in Truth magazine in 1894 and 1895. The four different black-and-white single panel cartoons were deemed popular, and one of them, Fourth Ward Brownies, was reprinted on 17 February 1895 in Joseph Pulitzer's New York World, where Outcault worked as a technical drawing artist. The World published another, newer Hogan's Alley cartoon less than a month later, and this was followed by the strip's first color printing on 5 May 1895. Hogan's Alley gradually became a full-page Sunday color cartoon with the Yellow Kid (who was also appearing several times a week) as its lead character.

In 1896 Outcault was hired away at a much higher salary to William Randolph Hearst's New York Journal American where he drew the Yellow Kid in a new full-page color strip which was significantly violent and even vulgar compared to his first panels for Truth magazine. Because Outcault failed in his attempt to copyright the Yellow Kid, Pulitzer was able to hire George Luks to continue drawing the original (and now less popular) version of the strip for the World and hence the Yellow Kid appeared simultaneously in two competing papers for about a year. Luks's version of the Yellow Kid introduced a pair of twins, Alex and George, also dressed in yellow nightshirts. Outcault produced three subsequent series of Yellow Kid strips at the Journal American, each lasting no more than four months:

 McFadden's Row of Flats (18 October 1896 – 10 January 1897)
 Around the World with the Yellow Kid – a strip that sent the Kid on a world tour in the manner of Nellie Bly (17 January – 30 May 1897)
 A half-page strip which eventually adopted the title Ryan's Arcade (28 September 1897 – 23 January 1898).

Publication of both versions stopped abruptly after only three years in early 1898, as circulation wars between the rival papers dwindled. Moreover, Outcault may have lost interest in the character when he realized he could not retain exclusive commercial control over it. The Yellow Kid's last appearance is most often noted as 23 January 1898 in a strip about hair tonic. On 1 May 1898, the character was featured in a rather satirical cartoon called Casey Corner Kids Dime Museum but he was drawn as a bearded, balding old man wearing a green nightshirt which bore the words: "Gosh I've growed old in making dis collection."

The Yellow Kid appeared sporadically in Outcault's later cartoon strips, most notably Buster Brown.

 Yellow journalism 
The two newspapers that ran the Yellow Kid, Pulitzer's World and Hearst's Journal American, quickly became known as the yellow kid papers. This was contracted to the yellow papers and the term yellow kid journalism was at last shortened to yellow journalism, describing the two newspapers' editorial practices of taking (sometimes even fictionalized) sensationalism and profit as priorities in journalism.The "New" Journalism, W. Joseph Campbell. Retrieved 10 October 2014

Merchandising
The Yellow Kid's image was an early example of lucrative merchandising and appeared on mass market retail objects in the greater New York City area such as "billboards, buttons, cigarette packs, cigars, cracker tins, ladies' fans, matchbooks, postcards, chewing gum cards, toys, whiskey and many other products". With the Yellow Kid's merchandising success as an advertising icon, the strip came to represent the crass commercial world it had originally lampooned.

 Other versions 

Entertainment entrepreneur Gus Hill staged vaudeville plays based on the comic strip. His version of McFadden's Flats was made into films in 1927 and 1935.

The Yellow Kid made an appearance in the Marvel Universe in the Joss Whedon-written Runaways story (volume 2, issue 27). In this take on the character, he exhibits superhuman powers.

In the Ziggy of 16 February 1990, Ziggy points to a smiling old man seated next to him on a park bench and says, "No kidding... You were The Yellow Kid!"

 Legacy
The Yellow Kid Awards are Italian comics awards presented by the International Cartoonists Exhibition and distributed at the annual Italian comic book and gaming convention Lucca Comics & Games.

See alsoAlly SloperHistoire de M. Vieux BoisMax and MoritzThe Katzenjammer KidsThe Little BearsLittle Nemo''
Alfred E. Neuman
Platinum Age of Comic Books

References

External links

Radio piece detailing the story behind the Yellow Kid, particularly his role in commercial advertising
The Ohio State University Billy Ireland Cartoon Library & Museum: Digital album of 88 Yellow Kid tearsheets from the San Francisco Academy of Comic Art Collection 
New York Times Book Review: "The Kid From Hogan's Alley" by John Canemaker
Yellow Kid Pinbacks

Comics characters introduced in 1894
American comic strips
Child characters in comics
Male characters in comics
Comic strips started in the 1890s
1890s comics
Comic strips ended in the 1890s
Comics adapted into plays
American comics characters
Fictional American people
Gag-a-day comics
Public domain comics